Christine Kindon  (October 1949), is a female retired swimmer who competed for England.

Swimming career
Kindon was ranked the number one backstroke swimmer in Northumberland and Durham during the early part of 1966 which led to her becoming a full international after being selected for the England team.

She represented England in the backstroke events, at the 1966 British Empire and Commonwealth Games in Kingston, Jamaica.

She was a member of the Hartlepool Swimming Club.

References

1949 births
English female swimmers
Swimmers at the 1966 British Empire and Commonwealth Games
Living people
Commonwealth Games competitors for England
20th-century English women
21st-century English women